Pepa Pavlova (born 1 January 1961) is a retired Bulgarian sprinter who specialized in the 400 metres.

She finished eighth in the 4 x 400 metres relay at the 1983 World Championships, with teammates Tsvetanka Ilieva, Rositsa Stamenova and Yuliana Marinova.

Her personal best time was 51.40 seconds, achieved in August 1986 in Sofia.

References

1961 births
Living people
Bulgarian female sprinters
Friendship Games medalists in athletics
Universiade medalists in athletics (track and field)
Universiade bronze medalists for Bulgaria